William Provost (Guilliame Provoost) (fl. 1556–1607) was a Protestant and a merchant who lived in Antwerp, then a city in the Netherlands. William's descendants settled in New Amsterdam (now known as New York (city)) in the early 1600s; he had famous descendants and relatives in North American history; and many North Americans can trace their lineage to William. William and his family appear to have survived the murderous rampage of the Spanish Fury in 1576. A version of William's life tells that he was a Huguenot that fled Paris on the day before the St. Bartholomew's Day massacre of 1572.

Name variants 
William Provost is his anglicized name and in records, William is variously referred to as Guilliame, Ghiliam, Gulliaem, Giljaem, Gutielmus, or Willem. Provost is also spelt, Prevoost, Provoost, Provoest, or the French form of Prévost.

The life of William Provost 
William Provost "... was a merchant, and resided in the business quarter of [Antwerp]. He and his wife belonged to the then secret Protestant movement, and it seems that they attended the underground Reformed Church named "De Brabantsche Olijfbergh" [The Brabant's Mount of Olives], but to avoid the Inquisition, they, as was the custom with most Protestants in this region and time period, had their children baptized in the Roman Catholic Church of St Walburgis in their neighbourhood." (Confirmation, with minor additions and corrections, is presented in.)

The St Walburgis' Catholic Church (known as Sint Walburgis Kerk in Antwerp) no longer exists.

William Provost and his second wife, Maeijken Stevens, may have fled Antwerp in 1576 at the time of the Spanish Fury. However, this has not been confirmed. Indeed there are records for William Provost’s family in Antwerp up to 1584 (although no supporting evidence is given in that reference). Perhaps they fled and then returned. At some time William Provost and his family seem to have moved to nearby Middelburg in the Province of Zeeland. Unfortunately Middelburg's archives were destroyed during World War II.

William Provost moved to Amsterdam around 1605 and he was still alive in 1607 when his daughter Katherina married. William's will, written in 1606, lists three of his children: Elijsabeth (deceased but whose child was alive), Katherina, and Wilhelmus.

A version of William Provost's life 
There is a version of historical events that have been attributed to William. Although some aspects of this version are incorrect it is important to document this version as these events have been oft quoted by his descendants.

There are two major historical references that document one version of William's life:
 A manuscript from 1724, written by William’s great great grandson David Provost (1670–1725)
 The book "Biographical and Genealogical Notes of the Provost Family from 1545 to 1895", written by a descendant Andrew J Provost

These references tell the story that William lived in Paris and was warned by a Colonel in the King's army about the impending St. Bartholomew's Day massacre. It is then reported that William fled to Holland with his fiancee, escaping the massacre. William was also described as "... a person of distinction and eminence ..." and "noble blood".

This version of William's life lists his children as Johannes, David, Wilhelmes, Elias, and Benjamin. Johannes was actually Wilhelmus or Guilliam, the father of David who emigrated to New Amsterdam (now known as New York (city)) in 1624 (see below).

There seems to have been some confusion regarding William Provost's story that was handed down to the following generations. Perhaps the story that William Provost was warned by a Colonel in the army and fled is correct ... only that it occurred in Antwerp prior to the Spanish Fury. Some of the descendants of William Provost may have incorrectly linked this event with the St. Bartholomew's Day massacre in Paris.

The immediate family of William Provost 
The family of William Provost [Ghiliam Provoost]:

William married Maria Karreman in 1556, William and Maria had:

 1. Maijcken Provoost (ca. 1557–1584); married Hans Mertens

 2. Elijsabeth Provoost (ca. 1559–); married Andries Jansz van der Muellen

William married Maeijken Stevens in 1564, William and Maeijken had (all baptised at St Walburgis' Catholic Church, Antwerp):

 1. Anna Provoost (1566–)

 2. Margareta Provoost (1567–before 1569)

 3. Margareta Provoost (1569–)

 4. Katherina Provoost (1570–); married Engbert Jobsz in 1607

 5. Wilhelmus Provoost (1572–)

 6. Sara Provoost (1573–)

 7. Esther Provoost (1574–before 1605); married David Damman

 8. Adam Provoost (1575–)

The genealogy of some of William's descendants, that lived mainly in the New York area, is documented to at least 1895.

Famous descendants of William Provost 
David Provoost was baptized in Amsterdam 11 August 1611 and passed away in New Amsterdam in 1656. He was the son of Wilhelmus (1572–). He travelled to New Amsterdam (now New York) in 1624, two years before the island was purchased from the local American Indians and some years later went back to Amsterdam and married and then returned with his wife to New Amsterdam in 1639.  David was a wine dealer while residing at the Heerenmarkt in Amsterdam. He became commissary of provisions (1640), tobacco inspector, lawyer, and notary public in New Amsterdam; and commander at Fort Good Hope.
 Merchant and smuggler David ‘Money Ready’ Provoost (1691–1781). The 90 acre site, Louvre Farm, on the eastern side of Manhattan, was owned by the Provoost family and had a cave where David hid his money. It was later said that David's ghost haunted the woods. A drawing of "The smuggler's tomb: David Provoost, free trader", by A H Wyant, 1875, can be viewed at the New York Public Library Digital Collection.
 David Provost was the Mayor of New York City from 1699 to 1700
 Reverend Samuel Provoost (1742–1815) was the third Presiding Bishop of the Episcopal Church, USA, as well as the first Bishop of the Episcopal Diocese of New York

Famous relatives of William Provost 
It has been suggested that two of William's brothers fled to Switzerland. However, that William was a brother of the two has not been confirmed. Descendants of this side of the family are:
 Major General Augustine Prévost (1723–1786) who was a Swiss-born British soldier who served in the Seven Years' War and the American War of Independence; and his son
 Sir George Prévost (1767–1816) who was Lieutenant Governor of Nova Scotia (1808-1811), Governor-in-Chief of British North America (1811-1814), and Commander-in-Chief of British forces in North America. He served in the West Indies during the French Revolutionary Wars and the Napoleonic Wars.

Open questions 
 Two references suggest that William's descendants also emigrated to Scotland. However, this has not been confirmed.

References 

Businesspeople from Antwerp
16th-century Protestants
Dutch emigrants to the Thirteen Colonies